3868 Mendoza, provisional designation  is a stony Vestian asteroid and binary system from the inner regions of the asteroid belt,  approximately 9 kilometers in diameter. It was discovered on 24 September 1960, by astronomers Cornelis Johannes van Houten, Ingrid van Houten-Groeneveld and Tom Gehrels at Palomar Observatory.

Orbit and characterization 

Mendoza orbits the Sun at a distance of 2.1–2.6 AU once every 3 years and 7 months (1,302 days). Its orbit has an eccentricity of 0.10 and an inclination of 8° with respect to the ecliptic.

Satellite 

In 2009, a minor-planet moon was discovered. It is provisionally designated . The satellite measures  in diameter and orbits Mendoza in a little more than a day.

Palomar–Leiden 

The survey designation "P-L" stands for Palomar–Leiden, named after Palomar Observatory and Leiden Observatory, which collaborated on the fruitful Palomar–Leiden survey in the 1960s. Gehrels used Palomar's Samuel Oschin telescope (also known as the 48-inch Schmidt Telescope), and shipped the photographic plates to Ingrid and Cornelis van Houten at Leiden Observatory where astrometry was carried out. The trio are credited with the discovery of several thousand asteroid discoveries.

Diameter and albedo 

According to the survey carried out by NASA's Wide-field Infrared Survey Explorer (WISE) with its subsequent NEOWISE mission, Mendoza measures between 8.628 and 9.351 kilometers in diameter and its surface has an albedo between 0.1621 and 0.436. The Collaborative Asteroid Lightcurve Link adopts Petr Pravec's revised WISE data, that is, an albedo of 0.1649 and a rounded diameter of 9.40 kilometers with an absolute magnitude of 12.71.

Naming 

This minor planet was named in honor of Mexican astronomer Eugenio Mendoza (born 1928), expert in photometry and spectroscopy, member of the IAU and teacher at several Mexican universities. The approved naming citation was published by the Minor Planet Center on 1 September 1993.

References

External links 
 Asteroids with Satellites, Robert Johnston, johnstonsarchive.net
 Asteroid Lightcurve Database (LCDB), query form (info )
 Dictionary of Minor Planet Names, Google books
 Asteroids and comets rotation curves, CdR – Observatoire de Genève, Raoul Behrend
 Discovery Circumstances: Numbered Minor Planets (1)-(5000) – Minor Planet Center
 
 

003868
Discoveries by Cornelis Johannes van Houten
Discoveries by Ingrid van Houten-Groeneveld
Discoveries by Tom Gehrels
4575
Named minor planets
003868
19600924